Hush Money may refer to:

Hush money (slang) in exchange for remaining silent 
 Hush Money (1921 film), a 1921 silent film directed by Charles Maigne
 Hush Money (1931 film), a 1931 comedy film directed by Sidney Lanfield
 Hush Money (2017 film), a 2017 crime thriller film directed by Terrell Lamont
 Hush Money (novel), a 1999 mystery novel by Robert B. Parker
 Hush Money (band), an American rock band starring former Hellyeah/Damageplan bassist Bob Kakaha